Water-reactive substances are those that spontaneously undergo a chemical reaction with water, as they are highly reducing in nature. Notable examples include  alkali metals, lithium through caesium, and alkaline earth metals, magnesium through barium.

Some water-reactive substances are also pyrophoric, like organometallics and sulphuric acid, and should be kept away from moisture. The use of acid-resistant gloves and face shield are required and should be handled in fume hoods.

Such substances are classified as R2 under the UN classification system and as Hazard 4.3 by the United States Department of Transportation. In an NFPA 704 fire diamond's white square, they are denoted as "W̶".

All chemicals that react vigorously with water or liberate toxic gas when in contact with water are recognized for their hazardous nature in the 'Approved Supply List,' or the list of substances covered by the international legislation on major hazards many of which are commonly used in manufacturing processes.

Alkali metals

The alkali metals (Li, Na, K, Rb, Cs, and Fr) are the most reactive metals in the periodic table - they all react vigorously or even explosively with cold water, resulting in the displacement of hydrogen.

The Group 1 metal (M) is oxidised to its metal ions, and water is reduced to hydrogen gas (H2) and hydroxide ion (OH−), giving a general equation of:

2 M(s) + 2 H2O(l) ⟶ 2 M+(aq) + 2 OH−(aq) + H2(g) 

The Group 1 metals or alkali metals become more reactive in higher periods of the periodic table.

Alkaline earth metals

The alkaline earth metals (Be, Mg, Ca, Sr, Ba, and Ra) are the second most reactive metals in the periodic table, and, like the Group 1 metals, have increasing reactivity in the higher periods. Beryllium (Be) is the only alkaline earth metal that does not react with water or steam, even if the metal is heated red hot. Additionally, beryllium has a resistant outer oxide layer that lowers its reactivity at lower temperatures.

Magnesium shows insignificant reaction with water, but burns vigorously with steam or water vapor to produce white magnesium oxide and hydrogen gas:
  
Mg(s) + 2 H2O(g) ⟶ MgO(s) +  H2(g)

And Magnesium does not react with cold water . It reacts with hot water to form magnesium hydroxide and hydrogen . It also starts floating due to the bubbles of hydrogen gas sticking to its surface .

Mg(s) + 2H2O(g) → Mg(OH)2(aq) + H2(g) 

A metal reacting with cold water will produce metal hydroxide. However, if a metal reacts with steam, like magnesium, metal oxide is produced as a result of metal hydroxides splitting upon heating.

The hydroxides of calcium, strontium and barium are only slightly water-soluble but produce sufficient hydroxide ions to make the environment basic, giving a general equation of:
 
M(s) + 2 H2O(l) ⟶ M(OH)2(aq) +  H2(g)

Reactivity series of metals

If metals react with cold water, hydroxides are produced.
If metals react with steam, oxides are formed.
Hydrogen is always produced when a metal reacts with cold water or steam.

References

Chemical safety
Water chemistry
Alkali metals
Alkaline earth metals